Doug Morrison (born February 1, 1960) is a Canadian former professional ice hockey player who played 23 games in the National Hockey League with the Boston Bruins between 1980 and 1985. The rest of his career, which lasted from 1980 to 1992, was mainly spent in the minor American Hockey League, and later in Europe. Doug is the brother of Mark Morrison, who also played in the NHL. Their sister married fellow Canadian hockey player Garth Butcher.

Morrison scored seven NHL goals--all during the 1980-81 season.  His first NHL goal occurred on November 27, 1980 in his team's 3-3 tie with Pittsburgh at Boston Garden.  Morrison recorded a hattrick versus the Los Angeles Kings on December 14, 1980 with all three of his goals coming consecutively in the third period.

Career statistics

Regular season and playoffs

External links
 

1960 births
Living people
Boston Bruins draft picks
Boston Bruins players
Canadian ice hockey right wingers
EC Bad Tölz players
EC Peiting players
EHC München players
EHC Uzwil players
Erie Blades players
HC Merano players
Hershey Bears players
Lethbridge Broncos players
Maine Mariners players
Salt Lake Golden Eagles (IHL) players
Ice hockey people from Vancouver
Springfield Indians players
Canadian expatriate ice hockey players in the United States
Canadian expatriate ice hockey players in Germany
Canadian expatriate ice hockey players in Italy
Canadian expatriate ice hockey players in Switzerland